Qingyundian Town is a town located on northeastern Daxing District, Beijing, China. It shares border with Boxing Subdistrict and Yinghai Town to its north, Majuqiao Town to its northeast, Changziying Town to its east, Anding and Weishanzhuang Towns to its south, as well as Huangcun and Xihongmen Towns in its west. According to the 2020 census, the population of Qingyundian was 69,612.

The name Qingyundian originated as an evolved version of Qingrundian, which in turn was given for the region's rich soil and abundant water supply during the Qing dynasty.

History

Administrative divisions 
As of the year 2021, Qingyundian Town was divided into 25 subdivisions, of those 2 were residential communities, and 23 were villages:

See also 

 List of township-level divisions of Beijing

References 

Towns in Beijing
Daxing District